Kobayashi (written:  lit. "small forest") is the 8th most common Japanese surname. Notable people with the surname include:

Art figures

Film, television, theater and music 

, Japanese actress and voice actress
, Japanese actor
, Japanese actor
, Japanese musician
, Japanese actor
, Japanese voice actress
, Japanese actor
, Japanese comedian and actor
, Japanese comedian, actor, dramaturge, theatre director and manga artist
, Japanese actor, voice actor and narrator
, Japanese film director
, Japanese voice actor
, Japanese dancer and actor
, Japanese actor
, Japanese actress
, Japanese actress
, Japanese actress and voice actress
, Japanese musician
, Japanese actress
, Japanese actor
, Japanese musician
, Japanese singer and model
, Japanese actress
, Japanese voice actress
, Japanese voice actress

Literature 
Audrey Kobayashi (born 1951), Canadian geographer and writer
, Japanese writer and literary critic
, Japanese chef and food writer
, Japanese poet
, Japanese writer and communist
Tamai Kobayashi (born 1965), Canadian writer
, Japanese screenwriter
, Japanese writer

Music 

, Japanese singer and voice actress
, Japanese classical pianist
, Japanese actress and singer
Hana Kobayashi (born 1982), Venezuelan singer
, Japanese jazz saxophonist and flautist
, Japanese music producer, better known as Kobametal
, Japanese model, actress and singer
Ron Kobayashi, American jazz pianist
, Japanese enka singer and voice actress
, Japanese voice actress and singer
, Japanese video game composer and pianist
Satoru Kobayashi (disambiguation), multiple people
, Japanese classical composer
, Japanese keyboardist, lyricist, composer, arranger and record producer
, Japanese roboticist
, Japanese voice actress and singer

Other artists 

, Japanese artist
, Japanese ukiyo-e painter and printmaker
, Japanese painter
, Japanese manga artist
, Japanese artist
Kunio Kobayashi (bonsai artist) (小林 國雄 born 1948), Japanese bonsai artist
, Japanese photographer
, Japanese manga artist
, Japanese artist
, Japanese photographer
, Japanese photographer
Robert Kobayashi (1925–2015), American artist
, Japanese anime director
, Japanese manga artist
, Japanese anime director
, Japanese manga artist
, Japanese photographer

Military figures 

, Japanese samurai
, Imperial Japanese Navy admiral
, Imperial Japanese Navy admiral and Governor-General of Taiwan

Politics and law figures 

Ann Kobayashi (born 1937), American politician and businesswoman
Bert T. Kobayashi (1916–2005), Justice of the Supreme Court of Hawaii
Bertrand Kobayashi (fl. 2010s), American politician
Leslie E. Kobayashi (born 1957), American judge
, Japanese politician
, Japanese politician

Science, technology, engineering, and mathematics figures 

, Japanese electrical engineer and computer scientist
Kevin Wesley Kobayashi, American engineer
, Japanese academic
, Japanese-American mathematician
Riki Kobayashi (1924–2013), American chemical engineer
Makoto Kobayashi (小林 誠 born 1944), Japanese physicist
, Japanese amateur astronomer
, Japanese computer scientist
, Japanese astronomer
, Japanese mathematician

Sports figures

Baseball 

, Japanese baseball player
, Japanese baseball player
, Japanese baseball player
, Japanese baseball player

Football (soccer) 

, Japanese footballer
, Japanese footballer
, Japanese footballer
, Japanese footballer
, Japanese footballer
Hiroki Kobayashi (footballer, born 1992), Japanese footballer
, Japanese footballer
, Japanese footballer
, Japanese footballer
, Japanese footballer
Paulinho Kobayashi (born 1970), Brazilian footballer
, Japanese women's footballer
, Japanese footballer
, Japanese footballer
, Japanese footballer
, Japanese footballer
, Japanese footballer and manager
, Japanese footballer
, Japanese footballer and manager
, Japanese footballer
, Japanese footballer
, Japanese footballer
, Japanese footballer
, Japanese footballer
, Japanese women's footballer
, Japanese footballer
, Japanese footballer
, Japanese footballer
Yugo Kobayashi (footballer) (born 1991), Japanese footballer
Yuki Kobayashi (football, born 2000), Japanese footballer
, Japanese footballer
Zach Kobayashi (born 1997), American soccer player

Wrestling 

, or Yosuke Kobayashi, Japanese professional wrestler
, Japanese professional wrestler
, Japanese professional wrestler
, also known as Hideo Itami, Japanese professional wrestler
, Japanese professional wrestler
, Japanese sport wrestler

Other 
 , Japanese synchronized swimmer
Celes Kobayashi (born 1974), Japanese boxer
, Japanese basketball player
Dawn Kobayashi (born 1971), Jamaican sport shooter
Etsuko Kobayashi (born 1992), Japanese cricketer
, Japanese golfer
, Japanese middle-distance runner
, Japanese sprint canoeist
, Japanese slalom canoeist
, Japanese Go player
, Japanese ski jumper
, Japanese racewalker
, racing driver
, Japanese diver
, Japanese shogi player
, Japanese gymnast
, Japanese Go player
Kunio Kobayashi (karateka) (小林 國雄 born 1967), Japanese karateka
, Japanese rower
, Japanese cyclist
, Japanese golfer
, Japanese biathlete
, Japanese squash player
, Japanese swimmer
, Japanese three-cushion billiards player
, Japanese Nordic combined skier
, Japanese figure skater and coach
, Japanese Go player
Royal Kobayashi (born 1949), Japanese boxer
Ryosei Kobayashi (born 1994), Japanese squash player
, Japanese ski jumper
, Japanesebobsledder 
, Japanese sport shooter
, Japanese judoka
, Japanese competitive eater
, Japanese aikidoka
, Japanese softball player
, Japanese badminton player
, Japanese cyclist
, Japanese middle- and long-distance runner
, Japanese basketball player

Others 
, Japanese gravure idol
, Japanese AV idol
, Japanese industrialist
, Japanese idol
, Japanese economist
, Japanese businessman
, Japanese conductor and composer
Sanzaburo Kobayashi (小林 参三郎, 1863–1926), Japanese surgeon
, Japanese journalist
, Japanese businessman
, Japanese fashion model

Fictional characters 
, a character in the manga series The Law of Ueki
, the protagonist in the manga series Miss Kobayashi's Dragon Maid
Kobayashi, a character in the film The Usual Suspects
, a character in the manga series Doki Doki School Hours
Amiko Kobayashi, a character in Marvel Comics
Atari Kobayashi, a character in the film Isle of Dogs
Daigo Kobayashi, a character in the film Departures
, a character in the anime series Mobile Suit Gundam
, a character in the manga series Cheeky Angel
Koji Kobayashi, a character in the film Godzilla Raids Again
Masafumi Kobayashi, a character in the film Noroi: The Curse
, a character in the media franchise Project 575
, a character in the manga series Please Save My Earth
, protagonist of the manga series Kemeko Deluxe!
, a character in the manga series Case Closed
, also known as Washu Hakubi, a character in Tenchi Muyō! media

See also 

Akiko Kobayashi (disambiguation), multiple people
Atsushi Kobayashi (disambiguation), multiple people
Fumiaki Kobayashi (disambiguation), multiple people
Hideaki Kobayashi (disambiguation), multiple people
Hirokazu Kobayashi (disambiguation), multiple people
Hiromi Kobayashi (disambiguation), multiple people
Hiroshi Kobayashi (disambiguation), multiple people
Hiroyuki Kobayashi (disambiguation), multiple people
Kaoru Kobayashi (disambiguation), multiple people
Kōji Kobayashi (disambiguation), multiple people
Makoto Kobayashi (disambiguation), multiple people
Mao Kobayashi (disambiguation), multiple people
Masahiro Kobayashi (disambiguation), multiple people
Masato Kobayashi (disambiguation), multiple people
Miyuki Kobayashi (disambiguation), multiple people
Osamu Kobayashi (disambiguation), multiple people
Takashi Kobayashi (disambiguation), multiple people
Yuki Kobayashi (disambiguation), multiple people
Yūsuke Kobayashi (disambiguation), multiple people
Yutaka Kobayashi (disambiguation), multiple people

References

Japanese-language surnames